Conte di Cavour or simply Cavour has been the name of at least two ships of the Italian Navy named in honour of Conte di Cavour and may refer to:

 , a  launched in 1911 and sunk in 1945.
 , an aircraft carrier launched in 2004.

Italian Navy ship names